Cynometra inaequifolia is a species of plant in the family Fabaceae. It is found in Malaysia, the Philippines, and possibly Thailand. It is threatened by habitat loss.

References

inaequifolia
Flora of Peninsular Malaysia
Flora of Borneo
Flora of the Philippines
Vulnerable plants
Taxonomy articles created by Polbot